Maria José Motta de Oliveira (born 27 June 1944), known as Zezé Motta, is a Brazilian actress and singer. She is considered one of the most important actresses in Brazil.

Life and career
Born in Campos dos Goytacazes, she moved with her family to Rio de Janeiro at the age of two. She attended the school of Tablado Theatre and began her acting career in 1966, starring in the play Roda-viva, by Chico Buarque. Other plays she worked in include Arena Conta Zumbi (1969), Orfeu Negro (1972), and Godspell (1974) She began her singing career in 1971 in the nightclubs of São Paulo. Between 1975 and 1979, she released three LPs, and a further three albums in the 1980s. In 1976, she starred in the film Xica da Silva. Over the decades she has acted in some of the most popular television soap operas and series.

Discography
 Gerson Conrad & Zezé Motta (1974) LP/CD
 Zezé Motta (Prazer, Zezé) (1978) LP/CD
 Negritude (1979) LP/CD
 Anunciação / Negritude (1980) Compacto
 Dengo (1980) LP/CD
 O Nosso Amor / Três Travestis (1982) Compacto
 Frágil Força (1984) LP
 Quarteto Negro (with Paulo Moura, Djalma Correia and Jorge Degas) (1987) LP/CD
 La Femme Enchantée (1987) DVD
 A Chave dos Segredos (1995) CD
 Divina Saudade (2000)
 E-Collection Sucessos + Raridades (2001) 2 CDs
 Negra Melodia (2011) CD

Television

 2017 - O Outro Lado do Paraíso - Mãe Quilombo
 2016 - 3% - Nair
 2011 - Rebelde - Dalva Alves (Dadá)
 2009/2010 - Cinquentinha - Janaína (Naná)
 2007 - Luz do Sol - Odete Lustosa
 2006 - Sinhá Moça - Virgínia (Bá)
 2005 - Floribella - Titina
 2004 - Metamorphoses - Prazeres da Anunciação
 2002 - O Beijo do Vampiro - Nadir
 2001 - Porto dos Milagres - Ricardina
 2000 - Esplendor - Irene
 2000 - Almeida Garrett - Rosa Lima
 1999 - Chiquinha Gonzaga - Conceição
 1998 - Corpo Dourado - Liana
 1996 - Xica da Silva - Maria da Silva
 1995 - A Próxima Vítima - Fátima Noronha
 1994 - Memorial de Maria Moura - Rubina
 1992 - Você Decide
 1990 - Mãe de Santo - Ialorixá
 1989 - Kananga do Japão - Lulu Kelly
 1989 - Pacto de Sangue - Maria
 1987 - Helena - Malvina
 1984 - Corpo a Corpo - Sônia Nascimento Rangel
 1984 - Transas e Caretas - Dorinha
 1978 - Ciranda, Cirandinha
 1976 - Duas Vidas - Jandira
 1974 - Supermanoela - Doralice
 1972 - A Patota
 1968 - Beto Rockfeller - Zezé

Cinema 

 2012 - Gonzaga — de Pai pra Filho
 2009 - Xuxa em O Mistério de Feiurinha - Jeruza
 2007 - Deserto Feliz - Dona Vaga
 2006 - A Ilha dos Escravos - Júlia
 2006 - Kinshasa Palace
 2006 - Cobrador: In God We Trust - Secretaría
 2006 - O Amigo Invisível
 2005 - Quanto Vale ou É por Quilo?
 2004 - Xuxa e o Tesouro da Cidade Perdida - Aurora Hipólito
 2003 - Carolina
 2003 - Sehnsucht - Miguel's mother
 2002 - Xuxa e os Duendes 2 - No Caminho das Fadas
 2002 - Viva Sapato!
 2000 - Cronicamente Inviável - Ada
 1999 - Orfeu - Conceição
 1997 - O Testamento do Senhor Napumoceno - Eduarda
 1996 - Tieta do Agreste - Carmosina
 1990 - O Gato de Botas Extraterrestre
 1989 - The Little Mermaid - Ursula (Voice-over; Brazilian version)
 1989 - Dias Melhores Virão - Dalila
 1988 - Mestizo - Cruz Guaregua
 1988 - Prisoner of Rio - Rita
 1988 - Natal da Portela - Maria Elisa
 1987 - Sonhos de Menina Moça
 1987 - Anjos da Noite - Malu
 1987 - Jubiabá 1984 - Águia na Cabeça 1984 - Para Viver um Grande Amor 1984 - Quilombo - Dandara
 1978 - Tudo Bem - Zezé
 1978 - Se Segura, Malandro! 1977 - Cordão de Ouro
 1977 - Ouro Sangrento
 1977 - A Força do Xangô
 1976 - Xica - Xica da Silva
 1974 - Um Varão Entre as Mulheres
 1974 - Banana Mecânica
 1974 - A Rainha Diaba
 1973 - Vai Trabalhar Vagabundo
 1970 - Em Cada Coração um Punhal
 1970 - ''Cleo e Daniel

References

External links

Living people
1944 births
Afro-Brazilian actresses
Afro-Brazilian women singers
Afro-Brazilian television hosts
Brazilian film actresses
Brazilian telenovela actresses
Brazilian stage actresses
Brazilian television actresses
Brazilian theatre managers and producers
People from Campos dos Goytacazes
20th-century Brazilian actresses
21st-century Brazilian actresses
20th-century Brazilian women singers
20th-century Brazilian singers
21st-century Brazilian women singers
21st-century Brazilian singers